646 Kastalia is a minor planet orbiting the Sun, not to be confused with the near-Earth asteroid 4769 Castalia.

References

External links
 
 

Background asteroids
Kastalia
Kastalia
19070911